Plesiotrochus souverbianus is a species of sea snail, a marine gastropod mollusk in the family Plesiotrochidae.

According to Strong & Bouchet (2008) is Plesiotrochus souverbianus a synonym of Plesiotrochus unicinctus.

Description
The height of the shell varies between 3 mm and 14 mm. The perforate shell is spirally striate, rather indistinctly longitudinally ribbed. The ribs are low and wide, rounded, and undulate the peripheral carina. The aperture is produced below into a short, narrow canal. The color of the shell is yellowish white, with thread-like spiral purplish lines interrupted by the ribs and generally arranged in pairs. There is a purple articulated line at the suture and the periphery, another one on the base.

Distribution
This marine species occurs in the Red Sea; and off the Philippines, Hawaii, Japan

References

 Vine, P. (1986). Red Sea Invertebrates. Immel Publishing, London. 224 pp

External links
 

Plesiotrochidae
Gastropods described in 1878